Eugenio Henke (1909-1990) was an admiral of the Italian Armed forces who served as the director of the Defense Information Service (SID) from July 1966 to October 1970. He became the Chief of Defense Staff from August 1972 to January 1975; he was the first sea soldier to hold the position in Italy.

Eugenio Henke, an admiral of the Italian Royal Navy, was born 15 November 1909 in Genoa, Italy; he enrolled in the Royal Naval Academy Livorno in ordinary courses and graduate in 1931. He became lieutenant during the outbreak of Second World War and was the deputy in command of the Vincenzo Gioberti destroyer until 1941. Eugenio Henke had participated in over 40 war and mission, 16 convoys escort missions, in inclusion was the battle of Capo Matapan, the Punta Stilo and the Capo Teulada.

Commands and ranks 
He was the command of Escort Torpedo boat Orsa during his promotion to lieutenant captain, was in March 1942, at La Spezia he was in command of VAS 235, was in 1943.

German troops in La Spezia 
During the German troops in La Spezia, was between September 1943, he was persuaded to leave the La Spezia port with the VAS 234, although the German troops were sent to occupy the Italian by surprise. The VAS 234 was under command of Rear Admiral Federico Martinengo. The German troops opened fire during the furious clash; the VAS 234 was hit and exploded; Eugenio Henke managed to escape with the other crew on it.

He was the commander of Sant'Alfonso a submarine fighter which was in November 1943, he headed the superior torpedo command under it training service until 1947 of which he rose up to be the deputy Chief of Staff of the Navy, he later became the frigate captain in January 1948 until when he was made the commander of the 1st Corvette Squadron school of the Naval command Rome in December 1951.

He was moved to the Ministry of Defence in 1953 until a promotion to captain of vessel captain in 1954, he rose to become the deputy chief of Navy and served as the head of general secretary of the Navy together as commander of the navy of Rome. He was promoted to rear admiral in 1960 and was commander of 4th Italian naval division in December 1964 before he rose to be the head of Defence Information Service at the rank of vice admiral in 1965, that experience great strategy of tension and massacre, although he already became an admiral since January 1968.

As the director of SID, he was involved in conducting Investigation of the incident but denied all it after the Ministry of the Interior in 1970 reported that it was from the SID that had reported a certain in Guerin Serac, in that 1970 during October he left the office of and moved on to commands the Central Mediterranean of NATO and at same time Vice President of the Marine Section of the Superior Council of the Armed Forces, he was also a Commander-in-Chief of the Naval Squad was between 1970 until when he was made the Chief of Staff of Defence in August 1972 by the Council of Ministers, he left the office on 31 January 1975.

Coup and testimony 
He was called by the judiciary department to testify some investigation which although he was involved, the one of Borghese coup and oil scandal during 1974, other was the one of which have to do with murder of a journalist Mino Pecorelli. He was later tried for helping to hide on the truth of the intelligence plane that crashed in Marghera was in 1973, the tried happen in 1989.

death 
He died in Rome at the Celio military hospital on February 4, 1990.

Awards 

 Bronze Medals for Military Valor.

References

Citations 

 
 
 
 
 

|-

1909 births
1990 deaths
Chief Commanders of the Legion of Merit
Chiefs of Defence Staff (Italy)
Italian admirals
NATO military personnel
People from the Province of Genoa

Commandeurs of the Légion d'honneur
Recipients of the Maurician medal
19th-century Italian military personnel